Vining is a city in Otter Tail County, Minnesota, United States. The population was 62 at the 2020 census.

History
Vining was platted in 1882. A post office has been in operation at Vining since 1882. Vining was incorporated in 1909.

Nyberg Park, located on Front Street, features a collection of scrap metal sculptures created by Vining resident Ken Nyberg.

Geography

Minnesota State Highway 210 serves as a main route in the community.

Demographics

2010 census
As of the census of 2010, there were 78 people, 34 households, and 20 families living in the city. The racial makeup of the city was 91.0% White and 9.0% from two or more races. Hispanic or Latino of any race were 1.3% of the population.

There were 34 households, of which 17.6% had children under the age of 18 living with them, 44.1% were married couples living together, 8.8% had a female householder with no husband present, 5.9% had a male householder with no wife present, and 41.2% were non-families. 41.2% of all households were made up of individuals, and 23.5% had someone living alone who was 65 years of age or older. The average household size was 2.29 and the average family size was 3.00.

The median age in the city was 46.5 years. 20.5% of residents were under the age of 18; 11.5% were between the ages of 18 and 24; 17.8% were from 25 to 44; 21.7% were from 45 to 64; and 28.2% were 65 years of age or older. The gender makeup of the city was 52.6% male and 47.4% female.

2000 census
As of the census of 2000, there were 68 people, 32 households, and 20 families living in the city. The racial makeup of the city was 95.59% White, and 4.41% from two or more races.

There were 32 households, out of which 21.9% had children under the age of 18 living with them, 56.3% were married couples living together, 3.1% had a female householder with no husband present, and 37.5% were non-families. 37.5% of all households were made up of individuals, and 21.9% had someone living alone who was 65 years of age or older. The average household size was 2.13 and the average family size was 2.75.

In the city, the population was spread out, with 19.1% under the age of 18, 2.9% from 18 to 24, 25.0% from 25 to 44, 20.6% from 45 to 64, and 32.4% who were 65 years of age or older. The median age was 50 years. For every 100 females, there were 106.1 males. For every 100 females age 18 and over, there were 96.4 males.

The median income for a household in the city was $21,250, and the median income for a family was $41,875. Males had a median income of $26,667 versus $21,875 for females. The per capita income for the city was $17,866. There were no families and 9.4% of the population living below the poverty line, including no under eighteens and 11.8% of those over 64.

Notable person
Vining is the hometown of NASA astronaut Karen Nyberg.

References

External links
 Ken Nyberg's sculptures 8-minute video of scrap-metal sculptures displayed in Vining
 

Cities in Otter Tail County, Minnesota
Cities in Minnesota